Alex Odhiambo (born 10 October 1943) is a Ugandan boxer. He competed at the 1964 Summer Olympics and the 1968 Summer Olympics.

References

1943 births
Living people
Ugandan male boxers
Olympic boxers of Uganda
Boxers at the 1964 Summer Olympics
Boxers at the 1968 Summer Olympics
Boxers at the 1966 British Empire and Commonwealth Games
Commonwealth Games bronze medallists for Uganda
Commonwealth Games medallists in boxing
People from Jinja District
Light-welterweight boxers
Medallists at the 1966 British Empire and Commonwealth Games